"Ring a Ding Dong" is Japanese musician Kaela Kimura's 16th physical single, released on June 9, 2010. The song was used in a wide-scale commercial campaign for NTT DoCoMo, which featured Kimura in the commercials.

Background

This single is the first to be released after Kimura's hit song "Butterfly," and the first after the announcement of her marriage to Japanese actor Eita.

Music video

The music video was shot by director Takeshi Nakamura. It features Kimura in a brightly painted room with many doors, dancing to the song along with four dancers, dressed in maid's outfits and suits and holding umbrellas. Through the video, more and more exotically dressed dancers enter the room and begin dancing.

Track listing

*Tracks 2-9 live recordings from Kimura's Live Tour 2010 "5 Years" @ Nippon Budōkan (March 27/28 2010).

Chart rankings

Reported sales and certifications

See also
List of Oricon number-one singles of 2010
List of number-one digital singles of 2010 (Japan)

References

External links
Columbia "Ring a Ding Dong" profile 

Kaela Kimura songs
2010 singles
RIAJ Digital Track Chart number-one singles
Oricon Weekly number-one singles
Songs about telephones
Japanese-language songs
Songs written by Kaela Kimura
NTT Docomo
2010 songs